The Primate Freedom Project is a 501(c)(3) not-for-profit grassroots animal rights organization based in Atlanta, Georgia. It is dedicated to ending the use of nonhuman primates in biomedical and harmful behavioral experimentation.

The project is the primary sponsor of the proposed National Primate Research Exhibition Hall (NPRX) at 26 North Charter, directly between the Wisconsin National Primate Research Center and the Harry Harlow Primate Psychology Laboratory, in Madison, Wisconsin.

The project provides information to the public concerning the use of nonhuman primates in biomedical and behavioral research in the United States. It advocates for the monkeys and chimpanzees held in American laboratories, primarily through encouraging supporters to write on behalf of individual animals, and through direct mailings to members of the United States Congress. It also supports affiliated grassroots efforts around the United States.

The organization gathers specific details about specific monkeys and chimpanzees in American laboratories through the use of the Freedom of Information Act and state open records statutes. Some of this information is used to memorialize identifying information about specific animals on tags that supporters can wear.

See also
Animal testing
Great ape personhood
Great Ape Project
Great Ape research ban
International primate trade
 List of animal rights groups
Non-human primate experiments

Notes

External links 

NPRX
Madison's Hidden Monkeys
Primate Freedom Project at UCLA
Utah Primate Freedom Project
Minnesota Primate Freedom Project
 , MadisonMonkeys.com

501(c)(3) organizations
Animal rights organizations
Animal welfare organizations based in the United States
Anti-vivisection organizations
Non-profit organizations based in Georgia (U.S. state)
Organizations based in Atlanta
Primate conservation